Ambewela is a village, and a hill station, located in the Nuwara Eliya District of Sri Lanka. The area is also sometimes called "Little New Zealand". Ambewela is also a service center to the New Galway tea planting district.

Climate and vegetation 
Due to the high altitude of  the mean annual temperature in the area is below , while frost is common during Winter. Ambewela is also popular for of being the highest (in altitude) and widest grassland in Sri Lanka. Mammals such as the Sambar Deer, Leopard dominate the majority of the forest cover around the area.

Similar to Horton Plains and Ohiya, this site is also one of the Important Bird Areas of Sri Lanka, making the area a popular location for birdwatching as well.

Importance and economic activities 
The climatic and economical conditions in Ambewela make it an ideal location for dairy farming, hence the country's only milk powder factory is situated in this area. The two animal husbandries, Ambewela Farm and New Zealand Farm, have Ayrshire cattle and Friesian cows respectively.

Potential for wind energy developments 

As the site is only used for livestock development and similar activities, the site is also an economical zone for erecting turbines, since cattle usually are not affected by wind turbines. These factors have attracted many local and international developers.

In 2003, the area was studied in a collaborative project between the Ceylon Electricity Board and NREL. The study revealed that the wind resource at the site is favourable only during the Southwest Monsoon, which is only a small period per year, and that the Northeast Monsoons does not reach the area due to its extreme altitude.

Transportation of equipment such as wind turbines is also a very significant challenge due to the extreme logistical conditions to access the site. The study revealed that transporting turbines larger than 600KW to the site would be a near-impossible task. The study also revealed that ignoring this issue and constructing wind farms with turbines smaller than 600KW would be extremely uneconomical to the developer.

Transport 
 Located on the intersection of the B512 (Nuwara Eliya to Horton Plains Road) and the B507 (Ambewela to Rendapola Road)
It is located on the Main Line between the Nanu Oya and Perakumpura railway stations, in the Nuwara Eliya District, Central Province.
 Main Road

See also 
 Ambewela Aitken Spence Wind Farm

References

External links 

 Ambewela Farms at Stassengroup.com

Populated places in Nuwara Eliya District